KIMS may refer to:
 Korea Invisible Mass Search, a Korean physicist collaboration in the search of dark matter
 KiMs, a Danish owned brand of chips and snacks owned by the Swedish Company Chips AB
 Madison Municipal Airport (Indiana) in Madison, Indiana

Medical
 Kalinga Institute of Medical Sciences, the medical school of KIIT University, Bhubaneswar, Orissa, India
 Karnataka Institute of Medical Sciences, a government medical college in Hubli, Karnataka, India.
 Kempegowda Institute of Medical Sciences, a college giving education in medicine in Bangalore, India
 Kerala Institute of Medical Sciences, a healthcare organization headquartered in Trivandrum, India
 KIMS Hospital, Maidstone, England
 KMU Institute of Medical Sciences, Khyber Medical University, Peshawar,Pakistan
 Koppal Institute of Medical Sciences, a government medical college established in 2015 in Koppal, Karnataka, India
 Krishna Institute of Medical Sciences (hospital group), an Indian hospital chain based in Andhra Pradesh and Telangana, India